I Remember Duke, Hoagy & Strayhorn is an album by American jazz pianist Ahmad Jamal featuring performances recorded in 1994 and released on the Telarc label.

Critical reception
Scott Yanow, in his review for Allmusic, states "the music is quite thoughtful and subtle, with plenty of surprising ideas and unusual turns".

In his review for the Chicago Tribune Howard Reich opined: "In retrospect, there's no doubt that Ahmad Jamal has been one of the most daring and influential pianists in jazz. His most recent release, I Remember Duke, Hoagy & Strayhorn, carries a greater feeling of sentiment and nostalgia than one expects from Jamal, but considering the nature of this recording-a fond remembrance of Duke Ellington, Hoagy Carmichael and Billy Strayhorn-the tender lyricism and warm tone of the performances seem appropriate. At the same time, Jamal brings to many of these tracks a harmonic sophistication and an ability to develop material that few pianists working today could match. The intelligence with which he merges various Ellington themes in 'I Got It Bad,' the startling chord changes he brings to 'In a Sentimental Mood' and the intricate way he works out themes in 'Chelsea Bridge' all recommend this disc."

Track listing
All compositions by Ahmad Jamal unless noted.
 "My Flower" – 2:33
 "I Got It Bad" (Duke Ellington) – 5:08
 "In a Sentimental Mood" (Ellington) – 9:21
 "Ruby" (Heinz Roemheld) – 5:57
 "Don't You Know I Care (Or Don't You Care to Know)" (Mack David, Ellington) – 4:45
 "Prelude to a Kiss" (Ellington, Irving Gordon, Irving Mills) – 4:22
 "Do Nothing till You Hear from Me (Ellington, Bob Russell) – 5:53
 "Chelsea Bridge" (Billy Strayhorn) – 4:41
 "I Remember Hoagy" – 4:30
 "Skylark" (Hoagy Carmichael, Johnny Mercer) – 4:36
 "Never Let Me Go" (Ray Evans, Jay Livingston) – 4:35
 "Goodbye" (Stanley Cowell) – 6:08

Personnel
Ahmad Jamal – piano
Ephriam Wolfolk – bass
Arti Dixson – drums

References 

Telarc Records albums
Ahmad Jamal albums
1994 albums